Schubertia  is a genus of flowering plants in the family Apocynaceae, first described as a genus in 1810. It is native to South America.

The name Schubertia has been used three times in botany, with this genus in the Apocynaceae the only one retaining the name. Species names created using the other two homonyms have all been changed in accordance with international botanical custom (see below).

Species
 Schubertia grandiflora Mart. - Argentina, Bolivia, Paraguay, Brazil, Peru
 Schubertia morilloana Fontella - Minas Gerais, Bahia
 Schubertia multiflora Mart. - Piauí, Bahia, Pernambuco
 Schubertia schreiteri Descole & T. Mey. - Chuquisaca in Bolivia; Jujuy + Salta in Argentina

formerly included
moved to other genera (Araujia, Cryptomeria, Glyptostrobus, Harmsiopanax, Macroscepis, Matelea, Sequoia, Taxodium, Widdringtonia)

References

Apocynaceae genera
Asclepiadoideae